The following lists events that happened during 1974 in New Zealand.

Population
 Estimated population as of 31 December: 3,091,900
 Increase since 31 December 1973: 65,200 (2.20%)
 Males per 100 females: 99.7

Incumbents

Regal and viceregal
Head of State – Elizabeth II
Governor-General – Sir Denis Blundell GCMG GCVO KBE QSO.

Government
The 37th New Zealand Parliament continued. Government was by a
Labour majority of 55 seats to the National Party's 32 seats.

Speaker of the House – Stan Whitehead.
Prime Minister – Norman Kirk then Bill Rowling
Deputy Prime Minister – Hugh Watt then Bob Tizard
Minister of Finance – Bill Rowling then Bob Tizard.
Minister of Foreign Affairs – Norman Kirk then Bill Rowling.
 Attorney-General – Martyn Finlay.

Parliamentary opposition
 Leader of the Opposition –   Jack Marshall (National) until 4 July, then Robert Muldoon (National).

Main centre leaders
Mayor of Auckland – Dove-Myer Robinson
Mayor of Hamilton – Mike Minogue
Mayor of Wellington – Frank Kitts then Michael Fowler
Mayor of Christchurch – Neville Pickering then Hamish Hay
Mayor of Dunedin – Jim Barnes

Events
 24 January – 2 February: Christchurch hosts the 1974 British Commonwealth Games.
 30 January – 8 February: Royal visit by the Queen for the Commonwealth Games and Waitangi Day accompanied by the Duke, Princess Anne, Mark Phillips and the Prince of Wales (now Charles III)
 6 February – Waitangi Day, then named New Zealand Day, is first celebrated as a nationwide public holiday.
 1 April – The Accident Compensation Commission is established, providing universal no-fault accidental injury cover to all New Zealanders.
 31 August – Prime Minister Norman Kirk dies of heart complications, aged 51. He was replaced by Bill Rowling, see New Zealand Labour Party leadership election, 1974. 
 September – The country's first Pizza Hut restaurant opens in New Lynn, Auckland.
 The voting age is lowered from 20 to 18.

Arts and literature
Hone Tuwhare wins the Robert Burns Fellowship.

See 1974 in art, 1974 in literature

Music

New Zealand Music Awards
BEST NEW ARTIST  Bunny Walters
RECORDING ARTIST / GROUP OF THE YEAR  Bull Dogs All-Star Goodtime Band
BEST NZ RECORDED COMPOSITION  John Hanlon – Is It Natural
PRODUCER OF THE YEAR  Mike Harvey – Is It Natural
ARRANGER OF THE YEAR  Mike Harvey – Is It Natural

See: 1974 in music

Performing arts

 Benny Award presented by the Variety Artists Club of New Zealand to Les Andrews.

Radio and television
 The target delivery date for colour television for all New Zealanders was when the country hosted the 1974 Commonwealth Games. 
Feltex Television Awards:
Best Programme: Richard John Seddon – Premier
Best Performer: Bill McCarthy
Best Actor: Tony Currie as Seddon
Writing: Alexander Guyan in Lunch with Richard Burton
Allied Crafts: Janice Wharekawa – Vision Mixer for Happen Inn and others
Special Award: Television team for the 1974 Commonwealth Games

See: 1974 in New Zealand television, 1974 in television, :Category:Television in New Zealand, List of TVNZ television programming, :Category:New Zealand television shows, Public broadcasting in New Zealand

Film
See: :Category:1974 film awards, 1974 in film, List of New Zealand feature films, Cinema of New Zealand, :Category:1974 films

Sport

Athletics

British Commonwealth Games

Chess
 The 81st National Chess Championship is held in Christchurch. The title is shared by P.A. Garbett and Ortvin Sarapu, both of Auckland.

Horse racing

Harness racing
 Robalan defeats hot favorite Young Quinn to win the New Zealand Trotting Cup
 Auckland Trotting Cup: Young Quinn

Soccer
 New Zealand National Soccer League won by, Mount Wellington
 The Chatham Cup is won by Christchurch United who beat Wellington Diamond United 2–0 in the final.

Births
 6 January: Dion Waller, rugby player
 10 January: Jemaine Clement, comedian
 28 February: Moana Mackey, politician
 21 March: Rhys Darby, actor and comedian 
 27 April (in Australia): Richard Johnson, soccer player
 6 May: Sean Pero Cameron, basketball player
 2 June: Andy Booth, motor racing driver
 15 June: Andrew Timlin, field hockey player
 10 July: Chris Drum, cricketer
 14 July (in Bulgaria): Pavlina Nola, tennis player
 26 July: Kees Meeuws, rugby player
 1 August: Michelle Turner, field hockey player
 27 August: Michael Mason, cricketer
 15 September: Emily Drumm, cricketer
 11 October: Liz Couch, skeleton racer
 23 October: Beatrice Faumuina, discus thrower
 5 November: Taine Randell, rugby player
 13 November: Carl Hoeft, rugby player
 2 December: Robbie Hart, cricketer
 7 December: Jason Spice, rugby and cricket player
 10 December: Chris Martin, cricketer
 Kate Duignan, novelist
 Tim Selwyn, activist
:Category:1974 births

Deaths
 12 February: Alice Bush, doctor and medical activist.
 13 February: Murray Hudson GC, soldier.
 13 February: Sir Leslie Munro, diplomat and politician.
 14 February: Charles 'Stewie' Dempster, cricketer.
 5 August: Robert McKeen, politician – 12th Speaker of the House of Representatives.
 12 August: James Fletcher, industrialist.
 30 August: Professor George Jobberns, academic.
 31 August: Norman Kirk, Prime Minister.
 7 September: Paddy Kearins, politician. 
 12 September: Hector Bolitho, writer and biographer.
 26 October: Dan Riddiford, politician.
 28 October: Charles Elliot Fox, missionary.
 11 December: Maurice Duggan, writer.

See also
List of years in New Zealand
Timeline of New Zealand history
History of New Zealand
Military history of New Zealand
Timeline of the New Zealand environment
Timeline of New Zealand's links with Antarctica

References

External links

 
New Zealand
Years of the 20th century in New Zealand